Volodymyr Pavlovych Pravyk (13 June 1962 – 11 May 1986) was a Soviet firefighter notable for his role in directing initial efforts to extinguish fires following the Chernobyl Disaster. Following the event, he was hospitalized with acute radiation syndrome and died sixteen days later. He was posthumously awarded the Hero of the Soviet Union and the Order of Lenin by the Soviet Union, and later the Ukrainian Star For Courage (later known as the Order for Courage) in recognition of his efforts.

Early life

Volodymyr Pravyk was born in the town of Chernobyl on 13 June, 1962. His mother, Natalia Ivanova Pravyk, was a nurse, and his father, Pavel Opanasovich Pravyk, a construction worker. Both were local Poleshuks who had lived in Chernobyl all their lives. Pravyk's younger brother and only sibling, Vitya Pavlovych Pravyk, was born eight years later.
In his childhood, Pravyk enjoyed reading and was academically inclined. He developed interests in photography, electronics repair, and mathematics. His mother expected that he would seek admission to a university to study the latter. However, with support from a neighbor who served in the fire service, Pravyk elected to enroll in the Cherkasy Fire-Technical Academy at the end of his primary schooling in 1979, and to become a firefighter.

Firefighting career
Pravyk completed a three year term of study and training at the Cherkasy Fire-Technical Institute between 1979 and 1982, and graduated as a junior officer in the Paramilitary Fire Service of the Ministry of Internal Affairs of the USSR (MVD). Following this, Pravyk returned to Chernobyl and took up a junior command position in Paramilitary Fire Brigade No.2 (СВПЧ-2) of the Kiev Executive Committee, based at the Chernobyl Nuclear Power Plant.

Commander of the Third Watch
By 1986, Pravyk was the commander of the fire brigade's third watch, and a lieutenant in the MVD.

The fourteen-man watch he commanded was not known for a high degree of discipline. In the words of Major Leonid Telyatnikov, the commander of the fire brigade: "It was a highly distinctive unit. You could say that it was a unit of individuals,... everyone was on his own. There were a great many veterans there, a great many mavericks." According to historian Serhii Plokhy, the men of the third watch sometimes "took advantage of [Pravyk] and occasionally let him down". The local men who filled the ranks were often related or from the same villages, and their longstanding relationships were hard for his authority to penetrate. Nevertheless, Pravyk led by example, and was attentive to the needs and desires of his subordinates. He brought their concerns and requests for time off and improved living conditions directly to Telyatnikov. He once publicly opposed his commander over what punishment a subordinate of his was to receive for confusing dates and missing his shift, calling for leniency in addressing the misunderstanding. The firefighters of his shift held him in high regard. Leonid Shavrey, a firefighter and squad leader in the Third Watch, is quoted as saying:
Pravyk was a very good guy. Brainy and competent. He was very knowledgeble about radio engineering, which he loved very much. He was something of a master with light shows or repairing receivers and tape recorders. And he got along well with the men. A fine commander. He could settle any question: if you approached him, he would see to it promptly.

In his time with the brigade, Pravyk helped to design and install a remote-control door-opening mechanism for the fire station's garage- which was a rare feature in the Soviet Union at the time. At the time of the accident, he was planning to continue his education and further his firefighting career by attending a Higher Fire-Engineering School, which would qualify him for a position as a senior officer.

Chernobyl disaster

Pravyk's shift was on duty at the time of the Chernobyl accident, and was the first firefighting unit to arrive at the scene. Pravyk and his fourteen-man shift had seen and felt the explosion, and quickly put on their protective gear, boarded three ZIL-130 AC-40s, a PNS-110 Pump truck as well as a ZIL-131 AR-2, the latter two being in the fire station's rear garage. At 1:33 AM, following the initial explosion, the alarm was sounded at the Chernobyl NPP Fire Station, calling them to respond to a fire at the power station. 
At this time, as the extent of the damage to the building and the number of fires became apparent, Pravyk radioed the dispatcher at the fire station to call in a number three alarm, which would summon all fire-protection resources from the entire Kiev Rayon to respond to the fire at the power station.

On arriving at the power station just three minutes after the alarm, stopping along the southern side of the plant, Pravyk left with squad leader Leonid Shavrey to determine the source of the fire inside of the building. Instructing the men outside to wait for instructions, they entered the power station and spent fifteen minutes running around the station trying to establish the source and nature of the fire. They learned that the roof of the turbine hall was burning as well as the roof of the third reactor, but were unable to determine much else. Knowing that the turbines in the turbine hall contained flammable lubricating oil and hydrogen gas, and that the hall itself connected the station without any partition, Pravyk determined the fire there to be the most immediate threat and ordered his men to begin firefighting on the roof of the turbine hall, using the external fire escapes to reach the roof.

The duty shift from the Pripyat fire brigade, Paramilitary Fire Brigade No.6 of the Kiev Executive Committee (СВПЧ-6) under the command of Lieutenant Viktor Kibenok, arrived at the power station at 1:45 AM. With the turbine hall roof fire being fought by Fire Brigade No.2, Fire Brigade No.6 was to address the many small fires ignited on the roof of Unit Three. Pravyk led a group of five men, including Kibenok and Vasily Ignatenko, to the roof of the ventilation building to begin this work. The firefighting work that followed was documented by Pravyk's regular radio reports, delivered by the fire station dispatcher to the MVD crisis center in Kiev and noted in the log-book there:
02:01 - An explosion happened in the reactor section of Unit 4 of the NPP. Reported by watch commander Pravyk.

02:05 - The explosion fractured empty hydrant pipes, a fire hose is being laid. Reported by watch commander Pravyk.

02:08 - Setting two "A" nozzles on the roof of Unit Three building to cool it. Reported by watch commander Pravyk.

The fighting the fires on the roofs of the reactor building and the ventilation block was made more difficult by damage sustained by the building. The dry standpipes, which were installed inside of the building to allow fire trucks to pump water up to the roof, had been damaged by the explosion. It was thus necessary for Pravyk to order that a hose be laid from the ground up to the roof, a height of seventy-one meters.

However, the high level of radioactivity soon began to affect Pravyk and the others. Working on roofs littered with highly radioactive debris ejected from the RBMK reactor by the explosion and inhaling radioactive smoke and other gasses exposed the firefighters to dangerously high amounts of radioactivity. On the roof of Unit Three, where fragments of uranium dioxide fuel and graphite moderator were emitting up to three-thousand roentgen per hour of gamma and neutron radiation, a fatal radiation dose of 500 rem could be received in a matter of minutes. Experiencing early symptoms of Acute Radiation Syndrome (ARS), Pravyk and his men were forced to descend from the roof. Firefighters sent to assist them on the roof met them half-way down the fire-stairs, vomiting and unable to support themselves without one another's help. Before his evacuation to Sanitary Unit No.126 (the Pripyat Hospital) at 2:25 AM, Pravyk asked those around him to contact his wife and tell her to close the windows in their apartment, so as to prevent radioactive contamination from entering.

Hospitalization and death
As the extent of the radioactive contamination released by the accident and the severity of their radiological injuries became clear, Pravyk and the other hospitalized firefighters and plant staff were evacuated by road to Borispol Airport in Kiev in the afternoon of April 26th, and then from there to Moscow by air overnight.

There he and the others were transported to Hospital No. 6, a hospital operated by Sredmash (the Soviet state nuclear energy agency) and the All-Union Physics Institute, which had a specialized radiological department for treating workers injured in radiation incidents.

During his hospitalization, Pravyk was attended regularly by his mother, who came from Moscow and remained there until his death. After the initial symptoms of his radiation exposure passed, Pravyk was optimistic, and hoped that he would recover and see his family again, writing a cheerful letter from his bed to his wife:
Nadya, you're reading this letter and crying. Don't dry your eyes. Everything turned out okay. We will live until we're a hundred. And our beloved little daughter will outgrow us three times over. I miss you both very much... Mama is here with me now. She hotfooted it over here. She will call you and let you know how I'm feeling. And I'm feeling fine.

However, as time passed, the more severe damage to Pravyk's body began to manifest. Radiation damage to his bone marrow had lowered his white blood cell count, leaving him extremely vulnerable to infection, and damage to other cells in his body put his respiratory and digestive systems at risk of failure. A bone marrow transplant, which would introduce healthy white blood cells from a viable donor into an afflicted patient, was the only treatment for such injuries at the time. However, Pravyk, according to his mother, had lost so many white blood cells that the doctors determined a transplant would not be a viable solution, and informed his younger brother Vitya, who had stepped up to volunteer as a bone marrow donor for his older brother, that he could not be of any help.

Pravyk succumbed to his injuries, with his mother at his side, around one in the morning on May 11, 1986. He was interred with full military honors at Mitinskoe Cemetery in Moscow on May 13, 1986. Pravyk, like other initial victims of the Chernobyl Disaster, was buried in a coffin enclosed in a zinc box with both his body and coffin enclosed in plastic.

Personal life

Volodymyr Pravyk was born near his place of employment, in the town of Chernobyl, and his parents lived there until the time of the disaster. His hobbies included creative endeavors such as photography, drawing, and poetry. He was also known for his aptitude with electrical engineering and repair. He was a member of the Komsomol, the youth division of the Communist Party.

Volodymyr Pravyk was married to Nadia Pravyk, whom he had met while he was attending the fire-technical school in Cherkasy and she was studying music in the city. They were married in 1984, and Nadia moved to Pripyat in 1985. Prior to the Chernobyl disaster, she was employed as a music teacher at a kindergarten in Pripyat. Volodymyr and Nadia Pravyk had one daughter named Natasha, who was born in Pripyat two weeks before the disaster at Chernobyl. When the disaster occurred, his parents came to visit him at the Pripyat hospital prior to his evacuation to Moscow. Through the window, Pravyk told them to see that his wife and daughter were evacuated safely to her parents' home in Central Ukraine, and that until that time they should stay indoors with the windows closed. When Pripyat was evacuated the next day, Nadia and Natasha Pravyk would travel to Horodyshche, the city where her parents lived.

Legacy

Pravyk has been given posthumous honors by both the Soviet Union and Ukraine. On September 25, 1986, by a decision of the Presidium of the Supreme Soviet, he was posthumously awarded both the Order of Lenin and the title Hero of the Soviet Union. In 1996, by a presidential order of Ukrainian President Leonid Kuchma, he was posthumously given the Ukrainian Star for Courage for "exceptional personal courage and dedication, high professionalism, shown during the liquidation of the Chernobyl accident".

Pravyk has also been honored with monuments and the dedication of landmarks in his memory. Busts in the Ukrainian city of Irpin, the "Alley of Chernobyl Heroes" in Kyiv, and at the fire-technical school in Cherkasy have been erected. The Cherkasy fire technical school itself was rededicated in honor of both Pravyk and Kibenok, who also graduated from the institution. A street is named after him in Cherkasy as well.
Pravyk's name is inscribed on several memorials to Chernobyl victims, including those in Kyiv and Simferopol.

Awards
  Hero of the Soviet Union (1986)
  Order of Lenin (1986)
 Ukraine's Order for Courage (1996)

See also
Chernobyl liquidators

Citations

Sources cited

1962 births
1986 deaths
People from Chornobyl
Heroes of the Soviet Union
Chevaliers of the Order For Courage, 1st class
Ukrainian firefighters
Soviet firefighters
Chernobyl liquidators
Victims of radiological poisoning